The Roman Invasion of Britain is a British documentary television series hosted by Bettany Hughes. It was first aired in 2009 on the History Channel in the United Kingdom. The three-part series explores the history of Roman Britain by tracing the interaction of Roman conquerors with the native population of Britannia.

In the United States, it was later seen on the Smithsonian Channel.

Episode list
 Onslaught
 Revolt
 Dominion

References

External links
Smithsonian Channel – The Roman Invasion of Britain
Top Documentary Films – The Roman Invasion of Britain
Bettany Hughes – official site

History (European TV channel) original programming
British military television series